Ørting is a village in Jutland, Denmark. It is located in Odder Municipality.

History
Ørting is first mentioned in 1302 as Yrthinge.

Notable residents
Rasmus Andersen (1861 — 1930), sculptor

References

Odder Municipality
Cities and towns in the Central Denmark Region
Villages in Denmark